44 Minutes: The North Hollywood Shoot-Out is a 2003 American crime action television film directed by Yves Simoneau and written by Tim Metcalfe. The film stars Michael Madsen, Ron Livingston, and Mario Van Peebles, and is based on the 1997 North Hollywood shootout. It premiered on the FX Network on June 5, 2003.

Plot
Homicide detective Frank McGregor tracks a violent duo of bank robbers: Larry Eugene Phillips Jr. and Emil Mătăsăreanu. They were named the "High Incident Bandits" by the LAPD.

On the morning of February 28, 1997, police officers get ready for work, while Phillips and Mătăsăreanu prepare to loot an armored bank truck. Meanwhile, SWAT officer Donnie Anderson is mourning the death of his father, a decorated policeman for over 31 years. He displays a lack of coordination with his unit during a raid on an apartment building, which almost causes one of his team members to be left alone with suspects, and is forced by his superior to take time off. Meanwhile, Phillips and Mătăsăreanu park outside the North Hollywood branch of Bank of America and wait for the armored truck to arrive. They are frustrated when the truck does not turn up and decide on robbing the bank instead. Donning black masks and homemade body armor, they enter the branch, firing at the roof with AK-47s. At the same time, an LAPD patrol car passes by, wherein a patrol officer notices the robbers entering the bank and call in a 211 for an armed robbery.

Phillips and Mătăsăreanu force the manager to open the vault and fill a duffel bag with all of the cash in the branch. While Mătăsăreanu has his back turned, the manager places a stack of notes rigged with a dye pack. With other officers arriving and setting up positions surrounding the bank, Phillips is shocked to see dozens of them and decides to walk outside, firing at them with his AK-47 and quickly being joined by Mătăsăreanu. The officers are heavily outgunned in the shootout. Anderson listens to the call on his radio, gathers his SWAT team, and races to the bank. After several minutes of firing and injuring both officers and civilians, Phillips and Mătăsăreanu decide to make a getaway. Mătăsăreanu drives their car while Phillips walks beside it and provides cover fire.

On Archwood Street, Phillips separates from Mătăsăreanu and starts firing randomly at the pursuing officers. While reloading, Phillips' AK-47 jams, and he is unable to clear it. He draws a pistol. Raising the finger, he continues firing at the officers. Then, he turns the pistol on himself, shooting himself under the chin while being simultaneously shot by McGregor. Meanwhile, Mătăsăreanu carjacks a pickup truck but is unable to start the engine since the driver disabled the fuel tanks before fleeing. The SWAT team arrives and corners Mătăsăreanu, who then takes cover behind his car, and a close-range gunfight ensues. The SWAT team eventually fires below the cars at Mătăsăreanu's legs; Mătăsăreanu is repeatedly hit in the feet and legs. Severely wounded, he drops his weapon and surrenders. It is later revealed that he dies of his gunshot wounds at the scene before paramedics can arrive.

The ending notes how the aftermath of the shootout proved to be a miracle, with no civilian or police deaths. It also notes how public opinion of the LAPD went up immensely due to their handling of the shootout. Actual footage is shown of LAPD officers receiving medals of valor and the public sending them thank-you notes and flowers in appreciation of their heroic efforts. McGregor closes by noting in an interview that "in 44 minutes of sheer terror, not one officer ran away. Everyone did their job, and I think that means something."

Cast
 Michael Madsen as Detective Frank McGregor (Based partly on Lt. Michael Ranshaw, Officer Edward Brentlinger, Officer Todd Schmitz, and Officer Anthony Cabunoc)
 Ron Livingston as SWAT Officer Donnie Anderson
 Mario Van Peebles as Officer Henry Jones (Based partly on Officer Stewart Guy, and partly on Officer Martin Whitfield)
 Ray Baker as Officer Jake Harris (Based partly on Loren Farrell, and partly on Martin Perello)
 Douglas Spain as Officer Bobby Martinez (Based partly on Martin Perello, and partly on Loren Farrell)
 Andrew Bryniarski as Larry Eugene Phillips Jr.
 Oleg Taktarov as Emil Mătăsăreanu
 Clare Carey as Frank's Wife
 Alex Meneses as Officer Nicole Gomez
 Dale Dye as SWAT Lieutenant
 J. E. Freeman as Police Commander
 Jay Underwood as "Mr. Entertainment"
 Julian Dulce Vida as Luis Rivera (Based on John Villigrana)
 Chris Jacobs as Rick
 Katrina Law as Kate

Filming
The building in the real robbery was in North Hollywood, but the building used for the bank in the film was a vacant bank in a strip mall in La Habra, California. All of the scenes that are set in the residential streets where the robbers fled were filmed in the actual locations.

Critical reception

John J. Puccio of DVD Town gave the film a mixed review, writing, "Apart from the interview interruptions, one cannot fault the way the actual shoot-out is handled in the film, although that doesn't make it any the less frustrating, real or not. [...] What we have is good enough for a television broadcast, but maybe not enough for anything but a rental on DVD."

In popular culture
"44 Minutes" is a song by the American thrash metal band Megadeth written by frontman Dave Mustaine that appears on their twelfth studio album, Endgame, which was released on September 15, 2009. The third song on the album, the song's lyrics portray the events of the North Hollywood shootout, that occurred in the North Hollywood district of Los Angeles on February 28, 1997. Though never released as a single from the album, the song has been played live by the band on several occasions. The name is derived directly from this film.

References

External links

2003 television films
2003 films
2000s American films
2003 action thriller films
2000s English-language films
2000s police procedural films
Action films based on actual events
American action television films
American action thriller films
American films based on actual events
American police detective films
Crime films based on actual events
Crime television films
Films about bank robbery
Films about the Los Angeles Police Department
Films directed by Yves Simoneau
Films scored by George S. Clinton
Films set in 1997
Films set in Los Angeles
Films shot in California
FX Networks original films
Television films based on actual events